Menzies Ferry is a farming locality on the west side of the Mataura River in the east of Southland District, in the south of New Zealand. It gained its name from Dr. James Alexander Robertson Menzies, who supplied a boat to ferry passengers across the Mataura. It was surveyed as a township in 1876.

Surrounding communities are Edendale to the north-west, Wyndham to the north-east, Mataura Island to the south, and Seaward Downs to the south-west. The terrain of the locality is generally flat, with a measured elevation of 26 metres above sea level at the centre of the area. There is no bridge across the Mataura here, the nearest bridges are upstream at Wyndham, and downstream on the road to Mataura Island. The main thoroughfare through Menzies Ferry, named Island Edendale Road, runs from the Edendale-Wyndham Road to the north, southwards to the Seaward Downs-Mataura Island Road just before the bridge.

There was a railway station named Menzies Ferry to the north on the Wyndham Branch, this closed to passengers in 1931, and to goods at or by the time the line closed in 1962. Edendale became the closest station for rail traffic thereafter. There was also a school and dairy factory in the centre of the locality. There still is a war memorial, which was erected in the school grounds, and unveiled on Anzac Day, 1922.

In January 1911, two children and their father, who tried to rescue them, were burnt to death when their farmhouse caught fire during the early morning milking time. The mother, now without children and a husband, sold the property soon afterwards.

References

Populated places in Southland, New Zealand